Bugle Boy Bop is an album by trumpeter Lester Bowie  and drummer Charles "Bobo" Shaw recorded in 1977 and released on the Muse label in 1983. It features seven duet performances by Bowie and Shaw.

Track listing
 "Bugle Boy Bop" - 6:11 
 "Go Bo" - 6:00 
 "Cootie's Caravan Fan" - 3:55 
 "Latin Recovery" - 4:17 
 "The Girth Of The Cool" - 7:28 
 "Chop'n Rock" 6:29 
 "Finito, Benito" - 6:23
All compositions by Lester Bowie & Charles "Bobo" Shaw 
Recorded live at Studio Rivbea on February 5, 1977

Personnel
Lester Bowie – trumpet 
Charles "Bobo" Shaw – drums

References

1983 albums
Lester Bowie albums
Muse Records albums